The Punilla Valley is a broad fluvial valley in the province of Córdoba, Argentina. It is located in the center-northwest of the province, bordered by the Sierras Chicas in the east and the Sierras Grandes and the Pampa Achala in the west, oriented from north to south. In the southern part of the valley lies the San Roque Lake, fed mainly by the San Antonio River and the Cosquín River.

The most important tourist location in Córdoba, the city of Villa Carlos Paz, is located on the southern shore of San Roque lake, though the valley is known for a number of other scenic towns, including Cruz del Eje, Capilla del Monte, La Cumbre, La Falda, Valle Hermoso, and Cosquín.

The Cruz del Eje and La Falda Reservoirs were completed within the valley in 1943 and 1979, respectively, to address the area's water and flood control needs, and have since become important recreational areas in their own right.

See also 
 Punilla Department

References 
 Bienvenidos al Valle de Punilla - Valle de Punilla.
 Córdoba Global - Valle de Punilla.
 Punilla Online - Todo el Valle de Punilla en un solo Sitio.

Landforms of Córdoba Province, Argentina
Valleys of Argentina